The Heartbreak Club is a 2021 Indonesian musical romantic comedy film directed by Charles Gozali, written by Bagus Bramanti and starring Bhisma Mulia, Denira Wiraguna, Dede Satria, and Emil Kusumo.

Synopsis 
Forced to close his cafe business in Solo due to bankruptcy, Jatmiko (Bhisma Mulia) does not expect to meet Saras (Denira Wiraguna), his last customer. Jatmiko did not dare to argue. Luckily, Anjani (Sisca JKT48), her sister, and Kopet (Erick Estrada), her best friend, swiftly help Jatmiko. Jatmiko and Saras are getting closer. The cafe was again crowded with customers. However, Saras tortures Jatmiko and chooses to date Abdul (Rezca Syam). Jatmiko collapsed, even fainted while watching Lord Didi Kempot's concert. With the help of Friend Ambyar and Lord Didi's advice, Jatmiko was finally able to make his choice.

Cast 
 Bhisma Mulia as Jatmiko
 Denira Wiraguna as Saras
 Rezca Syam as Abdul
 Dede Satria
 Emil Kusumo
 Asri Welas
 Fransisca Saraswati Puspa Dewi
 Didi Kempot
 Dwiky Al Asyam as Patung
 Erick Estrada as Kopet
 Mo Sidik as Om Faris

Release
The film was released direct-to-streaming on January 14, 2021 by Netflix.

References

External links 
 
 

2021 films
Indonesian-language Netflix original films
2020s Indonesian-language films
Indonesian musical comedy films
2020s musical comedy films
2021 direct-to-video films
2021 romantic comedy films
Indonesian romantic comedy films